William Henry Gibbs (November 29, 1823 – November 5, 1902) was a manufacturer and political figure in Ontario, Canada. He represented Ontario North in the House of Commons of Canada as a Conservative member from 1872 to 1874 and from 1876 to 1878.

He was born in Terrebonne, Lower Canada, the son of Thomas Gibbs and Caroline Tate who had gone there from Devonshire, England in 1819. He was educated in Montreal. With his brother Thomas Nicholson, he built a grist mill south of Oshawa. The two brothers built other mills and also operated a distillery and a tannery. Gibbs was also president of the Oshawa Cabinet Company. He served on the town council for Oshawa, also serving as reeve and later mayor. He was also deputy reeve for Whitby Township and warden for Ontario County. In 1845, he married Frances Colton.

Gibbs was defeated by Adam Gordon for the federal seat in 1874. Gibbs was reelected in an 1876 by-election held after Gordon's death. After his defeat by George Wheler in 1878, he made two more unsuccessful bids for reelection in 1880 and 1882. He died in Toronto at the age of 78.

References 

1823 births
1902 deaths
Conservative Party of Canada (1867–1942) MPs
Members of the House of Commons of Canada from Ontario
Mayors of Oshawa